Events from the year 1845 in the Netherlands

Incumbents
Monarch: William II

Events

 Netherlands Entomological Society
 De Tijd

Births

Deaths

References

 
1840s in the Netherlands
Years of the 19th century in the Netherlands